The 127th Pennsylvania House of Representatives District is located in Berks County and includes the following areas:

 Kenhorst
 Reading (PART)
 Ward 01
 Ward 02
 Ward 03
 Ward 04
 Ward 05
 Ward 06 [PART, Division 01]
 Ward 07
 Ward 08
 Ward 09
 Ward 10
 Ward 11
 Ward 12
 Ward 13
 Ward 14 [PART, Divisions 01, 04 and 05]
 Ward 15 [PART, Division 01]
 Ward 16
 Ward 17 [PART, Divisions 01 and 02]
 Ward 18 [PART, Divisions 02 and 03]

Representatives

References

Government of Berks County, Pennsylvania
127